Takeshi Imamura (1880–1960) was Director of the Karafuto Agency (1932–1938) and Mayor of Sendai (1942–1946). He was a graduate of the University of Tokyo and Tohoku University. He was a member of the Korean History Compilation Committee.

1880 births
1960 deaths
University of Tokyo alumni
Tohoku University alumni
Directors of the Karafuto Agency
Mayors of Sendai
People from Miyagi Prefecture
Members of the Government-General of Korea
Members of the Korean History Compilation Committee